The 1978 All-Big Ten Conference football team consists of American football players chosen by various organizations for All-Big Ten Conference teams for the 1978 Big Ten Conference football season. The only player unanimously selected by the conference coaches as a  first-team player was Michigan fullback Russell Davis. Michigan State flanker Kirk Gibson fell one point short of unanimity, and running back Marion Barber, Jr., fell two points short.

Offensive selections

Quarterbacks

 Rick Leach, Michigan (AP-1; UPI-1)
 Ed Smith, Michigan State (AP-2; UPI-2)

Running backs
 Marion Barber, Jr., Minnesota (AP-1; UPI-1 [tailback])
 Russell Davis, Michigan (AP-1; UPI-1 [fullback])
 Mike Harkrader, Indiana (AP-2, UPI-2 [tailback])
 John Macon, Purdue (AP-2; UPI-2 [fullback])

Flankers/split ends
 Kirk Gibson, Michigan State (AP-1 [flanker]; UPI-1 [wingback])
 Eugene Byrd, Michigan State (AP-1 [wide receiver]; UPI-1 [split end])
 Brad Reid, Iowa (AP-2 [wide receiver])
 David Charles, Wisconsin (AP-2 [flanker]; UPI-2 [split end])
 Ralph Clayton (UPI-2 [wingback])

Tight ends
 Mark Brammer, Michigan State (AP-1; UPI-1)
 Doug Marsh, Michigan (AP-2)
 Jimmy Moore, Ohio State (UPI-2)

Centers
 Mark Heidel, Indiana (AP-1; UPI-1)
 Steve Nauta, Michigan (AP-2; UPI-2)

Guards
 Ken Fritz, Ohio State (AP-1; UPI-1)
 John Arbeznik, Michigan (AP-2 [tackle]; UPI-1)
 Greg Bartnick, Michigan (AP-2, UPI-2)
 Dale Schwan, Purdue (AP-2)
 John LeFeber, Purdue (UPI-2)

Tackles
 Jon Giesler, Michigan (AP-1 [guard]; UPI-1)
 Jim Hinsley, Michigan State (AP-1; UPI-1)
 Joe Robinson, Ohio State (AP-1)
 Steve McKenzie, Purdue (AP-2, UPI-2)
 Keith Ferguson, Ohio State (UPI-2)

Defensive selections

Defensive linemen
 Curtis Greer, Michigan (AP-1; UPI-1)
 Melvin Land, Michigan State (AP-1; UPI-1)
 Ken Loushin, Purdue (AP-1; UPI-1)
 Keena Turner, Purdue (AP-1; UPI-1)
 Kelton Dansler, Ohio State (AP-1; UPI-2 [defensive end])
 Stan Sytsma, Minnesota (AP-2; UPI-1)
 Marcus Jackson, Purdue (AP-2; UPI-2 [defensive tackle])
 Jerry Meter, Michigan (AP-2; UPI-2 [defensive end])
 Dan Relich, Wisconsin (AP-2)
 Jim Ronan, Minnesota (AP-2)
 Byron Cato, Ohio State (UPI-2 [defensive tackle])
 Doug Friberg, Minnesota (UPI-2 [defensive guard])

Linebackers
 Tom Cousineau, Ohio State (AP-1; UPI-1)
 Joe Norman, Indiana (AP-1; UPI-1)
 Ron Simpkins, Michigan (AP-1; UPI-2)
 Dan Bass, Michigan State (AP-2)
 Tom Rusk, Iowa (AP-2; UPI-2)
 John Sullivan, Illinois (AP-2)

Defensive backs
 Mike Jolly, Michigan (AP-1; UPI-1)
 Tom Graves, Michigan State (AP-1; UPI-2)
 Vince Skillings, Ohio State (AP-1; UPI-2)
 Keith Brown, Minnesota (UPI-1)
 Mike Guess, Ohio State (UPI-1)
 Mike Harden, Michigan (UPI-1)
 Mark Anderson, Michigan State (AP-2; UPI-2)
 Dave Abrams, Indiana (AP-2)
 Pat Geegan, Northwestern (AP-2)
 Lawrence Johnson, Wisconsin (UPI-2)

Special teams

Placekicker
 Paul Rogind, Minnesota (AP-1; UPI-1)
 Scott Sovereen, Purdue (AP-2)
 Greg Willner, Michigan (UPI-2)

Punter
 Ray Stachowicz, Michigan State (AP-2; UPI-1)
 Tom Orosz, Ohio State (AP-1; UPI-2)

Key
AP = Associated Press

UPI = United Press International, selected by the Big Ten Conference coaches

See also
1978 College Football All-America Team

References

All-Big Ten Conference
All-Big Ten Conference football teams